Lucky Peak Reservoir (also known as Lucky Peak Lake) is a reservoir on the Boise River in the U.S. state of Idaho. It is located mainly in Ada County, extending into Boise County and Elmore County. It was created in 1955 with the construction of Lucky Peak Dam. Lucky Peak State Park surrounds part of the lake.

Gallery

See also

List of lakes of Idaho

References 

Lakes of Ada County, Idaho
Lakes of Boise County, Idaho
Lakes of Elmore County, Idaho
Buildings and structures in Ada County, Idaho
Buildings and structures in Boise County, Idaho
Buildings and structures in Elmore County, Idaho
Reservoirs in Idaho